The 1947 Saint Mary's Gaels football team was an American football team that represented Saint Mary's College of California during the 1947 college football season. In their sixth and final season under head coach James Phelan, the Gaels compiled a 3–7 record and were outscored by opponents by a combined total of 246 to 178.

Left halfback Herman Wedemeyer starred for the 1947 Saint Mary's team.

Schedule

References

Saint Mary's
Saint Mary's Gaels football seasons
Saint Mary's Gaels football